Renier Botha (born 28 September 1992) is a South African professional rugby union player who last played for in the Currie Cup and in the Rugby Challenge. His regular position is scrum-half.

Career

Youth and Varsity rugby

After playing high school rugby with Kimberley-based Diamantveld High School, Botha was included in the  squad for the 2010 Under-18 Craven Week tournament in Welkom. He also made one appearance for the  side in the Under-19 provincial championships.

Botha went to the University of the Free State, playing club rugby for them and making their Varsity Cup squad for the 2013 Varsity Cup. Towards the end of the season, Botha also made three appearances for former side  in the 2013 Under-21 Provincial Championship competition, playing as a centre.

Free State Cheetahs

Botha made his first class debut during the 2014 Vodacom Cup competition, eventually playing in all eight matches of the 's season.

With no Currie Cup experience, Botha was a surprise inclusion on the bench for the ' match against the  during the 2014 Super Rugby season. He got the opportunity due to an injury to first choice scrum-half Sarel Pretorius and with  scrum-half Tian Meyer being involved in the 2014 Vodacom Cup final.

Griquas

Botha moved to Kimberley during 2016 to join .

References

1992 births
Living people
Cheetahs (rugby union) players
Free State Cheetahs players
Rugby union players from Bloemfontein
South African rugby union players
Rugby union scrum-halves